The Gila tryonia (Tryonia gilae) is a species of freshwater snail in the family Hydrobiidae, the mud snails. It is endemic to Arizona in the United States, where it is known only from Graham County.

This snail has a conical, elongated shell reaching about 3.4 millimeters in length and 3.3 in height. The shell is transparent. The animal has fleshy lips on its snout.

This snail occurs at just a few spots in springs in the Upper Gila River system near Bylas, Arizona.

References

External links

Tryonia
Endemic fauna of Arizona
Graham County, Arizona
Gastropods described in 1987
Taxonomy articles created by Polbot